The 1985 Taça de Portugal Final was the final match of the 1984–85 Taça de Portugal, the 45th season of the Taça de Portugal, the premier Portuguese football cup competition organized by the Portuguese Football Federation (FPF). The match was played on 10 June 1985 at the Estádio Nacional in Oeiras, and opposed two Primeira Liga sides: Benfica and Porto. Benfica defeated Porto 3–1 to claim the Taça de Portugal for a nineteenth time.

In Portugal, the final was televised live on RTP. As a result of Benfica winning the Taça de Portugal, the Águias qualified for the 1985 Supertaça Cândido de Oliveira where they took on their cup opponents and 1984–85 Primeira Divisão winners Porto.

Match

Details

References

1985
Taca
S.L. Benfica matches
FC Porto matches